Bartolommeo Camulio was an Italian painter, active in Genoa in the early to mid-14th century. He painted a Madonna of the Humility (1340) in the Palermo Gallery. Also known as Bartolomeo da Camogli or Bartolomeo Pellerano da Camogli.

References

Painters from Genoa
14th-century Italian painters
Italian male painters
Year of death unknown
Year of birth unknown